Markham Public Library (MPL) is a library system operated by the municipal government of the City of Markham in Canada. There are eight branches in the city, serving about 250,000 residents in Markham. The libraries are managed by the Administration Centre, located at 6031 Highway 7.

In 2008, the system was renamed to the singular Markham Public Library to reflect its status as one unified system. Its current Chief Executive Officer (CEO) is Catherine Biss.

History

While the current library system dates back to the 1970s, there was the subscription based system popular in 19th Century Ontario, the Mechanics’ Institute, operated out of the Old Town Hall on Main Street.

Branches
The Markham Public Library has 8 branches.
The Markham Public Library branches are:
 Aaniin Library 
 Angus Glen Library
 Cornell Library
 Markham Village Library
 Milliken Mills Library
 Thornhill Community Library
 Thornhill Village Library
 Unionville Library

Customer-Centred Classification

The Markham Village branch was the first to develop its own library classification system called the Customer Centred Classification (C3). Compared to the Dewey Decimal Classification (DDC) or Library of Congress Classification (LCC), C3 is more modern and is supposed to be easier for library patrons to find books at the book stacks.  All branches utilize the C3 cataloguing system for their non-fiction collection.  The Thornhill Village branch started the migration to C3 in 2009, and C3 is used by the Thornhill Community Centre branch when it re-opened in 2011.

Membership

People who work, live, or attend a school in York Region may apply for a free membership. Otherwise, a $60.00 annual membership fee will apply.

Services

Like many other libraries across Ontario, the Markham Public Library system allows members to check out books and other physical and online media. Members can:

 Place up to 75 holds per one membership account; 
 Check out 100 physical items per one membership account;
 Use TeleCirc Telephone Library Service;
 Use the Interlibrary loan service;
 Access free online courses

Borrowing privileges

Other services

Other than borrowing books and media, the following services are available:
 Free WiFi Internet
Library Catalogue access
One hour internet access per day per membership account (additional time can be requested - guest logins are available for those without a library card)
 One hour of Microsoft Office or OpenOffice (depending on the branch) per day per membership account
Regular programs for preschool, children, teen, and adults
Time specific programs, eg. PA Days, Winter Breaks, March Breaks, and Summer Holidays
Meeting rooms for rent
 Study rooms of various occupancy (inquire at specific branch for availability and bookings)
 Photocopying, printing, scanning
 Maker Space at Aaniin branch with 3D printers and laser cutter, virtual reality, and equipment for robotics, circuitry and coding  
Kids Makerspace at Connell branch has toys and digital tools that are geared toward STEAM
Digital Media Lab for graphic designs, making and editing videos, music and podcasts, etc

See also
Public libraries in Ontario
City of Markham

References

External links

 
 Markham Public Libraries' photostream on Flickr

Public libraries in Ontario
Buildings and structures in Markham, Ontario
Education in Markham, Ontario